Cariamanga is a town in the Loja Province of Ecuador. It is the capital of the Calvas Canton.

References 

 www.inec.gov.ec
 www.ame.gov.ec

External links 
 Map of Loja Province

Populated places in Loja Province